Perexilibacter aurantiacus is a Gram-negative, strictly aerobic and rod-shaped bacterium from the genus of Perexilibacter which has been isolated from sediments from the Carp Island on Palau.

References

External links
Type strain of Perexilibacter aurantiacus at BacDive -  the Bacterial Diversity Metadatabase

Sphingobacteriia
Bacteria described in 2007